A typewriter is a mechanical or electromechanical machine for typing characters.

Typewriter or Typewriters may also refer to:
 The Typewriter, a short composition of light music by Leroy Anderson
 Typewriter (TV series), an Indian web television series
 Ilion Typewriters, an American minor league baseball team